Ngonini is a village in the Hhohho Region of northern Eswatini.

It is served by Piggs Peak Airfield.

Reference
Ebenezer A.M.E church

Its an open map area situated along  Piggs Peak -Matsamo road ...at Mgobodzi before Cleopas station just on your right when going to matsamo 

Its an African Methodist Church which was officially opened in 2018 by Bishop Stafford Wicker from the United States of America. Its made of few families when opening the church Bro Mphumuzi Shongwe was the Trustees Proterm and sister Glenrose Mahlangu was the Steward Proterm under Rev Mehluko S Ndlangamandla

Fitzpatrick, M., Blond, B., Pitcher, G., Richmond, S., and Warren, M. (2004)  South Africa, Lesotho and Swaziland. Footscray, VIC: Lonely Planet.

Populated places in Hhohho Region